"I See Me" is a song recorded by American country music artist Travis Tritt.  It was released in March 2005 as the third single from the album My Honky Tonk History.  The song reached #32 on the Billboard Hot Country Singles & Tracks chart.  The song was written by Casey Beathard and former NFL player Chris Mohr.

Chart performance

References

2005 singles
2004 songs
Travis Tritt songs
Songs written by Casey Beathard
Song recordings produced by Billy Joe Walker Jr.
Columbia Records singles